Hamad Khalaily (1928 - May 13, 2014) was an Arab-Israeli politician who served as a member of the Knesset for the Alignment from 1981 until 1984.

Biography
Khalaily was born in Sakhnin during the Mandate era and received a high school education. He worked for the Histadrut trade union as a clerk.

In 1981 he was elected to the Knesset on the Alignment list. He sat on the Education and Culture Committee and the Committee for the Appointment of Qadis, until losing his seat in the 1984 elections.

References

External links

1928 births
2014 deaths
People from Sakhnin
Arab people in Mandatory Palestine
Israeli trade unionists
Arab members of the Knesset
Alignment (Israel) politicians
Members of the 10th Knesset (1981–1984)